Jinxiang County is a county of southwestern Shandong province, People's Republic of China, bordering Jiangsu province to the southeast. It is under the administration of Jining City.

The county town of Jinxiang is known as "the world's garlic capital", producing 80% of the world's garlic exports.

Administrative divisions
As 2012, this county is divided to 9 towns and 4 townships.
Towns

Townships

Climate

References

External links 
 Official homepage

 
Counties of Shandong
Jining